William Jay Gaynor was a mayor of New York City.

William Gaynor may 
also refer to:
 William J. Gaynor (fireboat), a New York Fire Department fireboat

See also
 William Gayner